Libby Heaney is a British artist and quantum physicist known for her pioneering work on AI and quantum computing. She works on the impact of future technologies and is widely known to be the first artist to use quantum computing as a functioning artistic medium. Her work has been featured internationally, including in the Victoria and Albert Museum, Tate Modern and the Science Gallery. She is currently a resident of Somerset House Studios.

Early life and scientific career 
Heaney is from Tamworth, Staffordshire. She studied physics at Imperial College London, graduating in 2005 with first class honours. Libby pursued a successful career in quantum physics, completing a PhD thesis on mode entanglement in ultra-cold atomic gases at the University of Leeds, and pursued her own research as a postdoctoral fellow at the University of Oxford and at the National University of Singapore. In 2008, Heaney was awarded the Institute of Physics Very Early Career Woman in Physics Award (now Jocelyn Bell Burnell Medal and Prize).

Artistic career 
In 2013 Heaney returned to the UK and completed a master's degree at the University of the Arts London. She studied arts and science at Central Saint Martins and graduated in 2015. She then became a lecturer at the Royal College of Art, teaching Information Experience Design. In 2016, she created Lady Chatterley's Tinderbot which presented Tinder conversations between real users and AI bots programmed using Lady Chatterley's Lover. Lady Chatterley's Tinderbot was covered by BBC News, TheJournal.ie and the Irish Examiner and was exhibited internationally.

In 2017, Heaney was commissionned by Sky Arts and the Barbican Centre to design Britbot, an internet bot built using artificial intelligence and the citizenship book Life in the UK: a guide for new residents.  The book, a manual for the citizenship test, has been described by Heaney as being "largely a white male privileged version of British history and culture". The bot spoke to  the public about what it meant to be British and learnt from their responses to become an ever changing, plural version of Britishness. She was awarded an Arts Council England grant to widen participation of the Britbot to social media. Heaney has exhibited Britbot at the Victoria and Albert Museum, at CogX, the Sheffield Documentary Festival the Edinburgh TV festival, and Art Ai in Leicester.

She has been creating with quantum computing since 2019, and has created artworks using quantum computing for Light Art Space (LAS) in Berlin, Somerset House and arebyte in London. Using quantum code, storytelling, and immersive installations and performances, Libby Heaney's works such as Ent- and slimeqore explore and warn against the double-edged potential of quantum computing and its exploitation by private companies. In 2022, Ent- received the Lumen Prize immersive environment award.

Major works

Ent- and The Evolution of Ent-: QX (2022) 
In 2022, Libby Heaney was commissioned by Light Art Space to create Ent-, a 360 immersive installation that revisits Bosch’s Garden of Earthly Delights through quantum. The work uses quantum computing as both a medium and a paradigm through which to conceive human and non-human relations.

Ent- was exhibited at LAS, Ars Electronica, and arebyte gallery in London. The work was also modified to fit a full dome projection at the Deutsches Museum in Munich, projected onto a public facade in Seoul, and turned into a playable version for an exhibition at Nahmad Contemporary in New York.

In 2022, Ent- was a winner in the Art Science Category of the Falling Walls prize and received the Lumen Prize immersive environment award.

The Evolution of Ent-:QX, first displayed at arebyte gallery in London, builds on Ent- and imagines a fictional quantum computing company (QX) that appropriates, parodies and subverts the language of big tech in order to educate the viewer on current profit-oriented uses of quantum computing as well as propose new ways to think about and use the technology.

SlimeQore (2022) 
SlimeQore is a performative lecture accompanied by an immersive video montage, first performed at the Zabludowicz Collection in June 2022. In December 2022, it was translated into Italian and performed by actor Chiara Ferrara at Roma Europa festival in Rome. It uses slime as a metaphor for quantum particles and for the slimy world of big tech. Throughout the performance, Libby invites the audience to play with slime in order to understand the fluid nature of quantum physics and its implications.

Touch is response-ability (2020) 
Touch is response-ability is an instagram performance and touch screen installation where participants activate animations by flicking through instagram stories. The performance investigates representations of the female body in art history and through computer vision to see how stereotypes are socially constructed and maintained. Images of the body are passed through a quantum algorithm, and as the users interact with them they progressively become fragmented and dissolve beyond recognition.

The work was originally commissioned by Hervisions at LUX in 2020 and performed on the LUX instagram account. It was also exhibited at Etopia Zaragoza in 2021 and at Art SG with Gazelli Art House in 2023.

Lady Chatterley's Tinderbot (2016) 
In Lady Chatterley’s Tinderbot, Libby Heaney programmed a bot to engage in conversations on Tinder by using lines from the 1928 novel Lady Chatterley’s Lover, by D.H. Lawrence. The work was first shown as an interactive installation in 2016 at the Dublin Science Gallery, allowing visitors to swipe left or right to navigate through various conversations.

Lady Chatterley’s Tinderbot was also exhibited at Sonar+D in Barcelona (2017), the Telefonica Fundacion in Lima (2017), the Lowry in Salford (2018), RMIT gallery in Melbourne (2021), Microwave Festival in Hong Kong (2022) and was shortlisted for the HEK-Basel Net-based art award in 2018.

Selected exhibitions 

2022 - Every Kind of Wind: Calder and the 21st Century, Nahmad Contemporary, New York
2022 - remiQXing still, Fiumano Clase, London
2022 - the Evolution of Ent-: QX, arebyte, London
2022 - Ent-, Light Art Space x Schering Stiftung, Berlin  
2022 - Among the Machines, Zabludowicz Collection, London
2022 - BioMedia, ZKM, Karlsruhe
2021 - CASCADE, Southbank Centre, London
2021 - Agency is the Ability to Act, Holden Gallery, Manchester
2021 - BIAS, Science Gallery, Dublin 
2021 - Ars Electronica, Linz
2021 - AI & Music, S+T+ARTS & Sonar Festival, CCCB, Barcelona
2020 - Real Time Constraints, arebyte, London
2019 - Euro(re)visions, Goethe Institut, London
2019 - Higher Resolutions with Hyphen Labs, Tate Modern, London
2019 - Open Fest with Sky Arts, Barbican, London
2018 - Digital Design Weekend, V&A, London
2018 - FAKE, Science Gallery, Dublin
2017 - Ars Electronica, Linz
2017 - Entangled: Quantum Computer Art, Royal College of Art, London
2017 - Humans Need Not Apply, Science Gallery, Dublin

Awards and honours 
Her awards include
2022 - Lumen Prize, BCS Immersive Environment Award (for Ent-)
2022 - Mozilla Foundation Creative Media Award, USA
2022 - nominated for the S+T+ARTS prize
2021 - Adaptation Award, Artquest, London
2021 - British Council Amplify Collaboration Award
2018 - Arts Council England, National Lottery Project Grant
2018 - HeK Basel Net Based Art Award (shortlisted for Tinderbot)
2017 - Sky Arts 50
2016 - LIFEBOAT programme award
2015 - University of the Arts London Picton Art Prize (shortlisted) 
2015 - Helen Scott Lidgett Award (shortlisted) 
2014 - Ideas Tap Innovators Award

References 

Living people
21st-century British women artists
British women physicists
Quantum physicists
Alumni of Imperial College London
Alumni of the University of the Arts London
Academics of the University of Oxford
People from Tamworth, Staffordshire
Year of birth missing (living people)